Claudia Kemfert (born 17December 1968) is a German economics expert in the areas of energy research and environmental protection. She is a Professor of Energy Economics and Sustainability at the Hertie School of Governance in Berlin. She heads the Energy, Transportation, and Environment department at the German Institute for Economic Research (DIW Berlin).

Early life and education
Kemfert was born in Delmenhorst, West Germany. She studied Economics at the Bielefeld University, the University of Oldenburg, where she graduated in 1998. After graduating, she held a post-doctoral research visit at the Fondazione Eni Enrico Mattei (FEEM) in Milan in 1998.

Career
Following her post-doc, from January 1999 to April 2000, Kemfert led a research group at the Institute for Rational Application of Energies at the University of Stuttgart.  As a guest professor, she taught at the University of St. Petersburg (2003–2004), University of Moscow (2000–2001) and University of Siena (1998, 2002–2003). From 2000 to 2004, Kemfert had a position as an assistant professor and was the leader of a research group at the University of Oldenburg.

Other activities
Outside of academia, Kemfert served as shadow minister for energy policy in the campaigns of Norbert Röttgen (CDU) in North Rhine-Westphalia (2012) and of Thorsten Schäfer-Gümbel (SPD) in Hesse (2013).

She also advised President of the European Commission José Manuel Barroso in a high-level Group on Energy and Climate. Moreover, she acts as an external expert for the Intergovernmental Panel of Climate Change (IPCC). Kemfert was a member of the High Level Expert Group of the European Commissioner for the Environment and of the Advisory Group on Energy at the European Commission's Directorate-General for Research and Innovation. She also acts as a jury member for several significant sustainability prices.

In addition, Kemfert holds a variety of positions, including the following:
 100 Prozent Erneuerbar Stiftung, Member of the Board of Trustees
 Austrian Institute of Economic Research (WIFO), Member of the International Board
 Berlin University of Applied Sciences and Technology, Member of the Board of Trustees
 Federal Academy for Security Policy (BAKS), Member of the Advisory Board (since 2015)
 Club of Rome, Germany Chapter, Member of the Presidium (since 2011) 
 Deutsche Umweltstiftung, Member of the Advisory Board
 Deutsches Museum, Member of the Board of Trustees
 Energie Campus Nürnberg (EnCN), Member of the Advisory Board
 Energy Research Centre of Lower Saxony (EFZN), Member of the Advisory Board
 Energy Watch Group (EWG), Member
 German Climate Foundation, Member of the Scientific Advisory Board
 Innovation Center Energy (IZE) at the Technical University of Berlin, Member of the Board of Trustees
 Technologiestiftung Berlin, Member of the Board
 University of Konstanz, Member of the University Council

Awards
Kemfert got an award from DAAD and was honoured in 2006 as top German Scientist from the German research foundation, Helmholtz and Leibniz Association ("Elf der Wissenschaft"). In 2011 she was awarded with the Urania Medaille as well as B.A.U.M. Environmental Award for Best Science and got the German-Solar-Award and the Adam-Smith-Award for Market-Based Environmental Policy in 2016.

Selected publications
 Kemfert, C. (2013): The battle about electricity: Myths, power and monopolies, Hamburg: Murmann
 Kemfert, C., Kunz, F., Rosellón, J. (2016): A Welfare Analysis of Electricity Transmission Planning in Germany. In: Energy Policy. 94 (2016), p. 446-452
 The European Electricity and climate policy - complement or substitute?. In: Environment and Planning / C 25 (2007), 1, S. 115–130,2007
 Haftendorn,C., Holz, F., Kemfert, C. (2012): What about Coal? Interactions between Climate Policies and the Global Steam Coal Market until 2030. In: Energy Policy 48 (2012), pp. 274–283
 Traber, T., Kemfert, C. (2011): Gone with the Wind? Electricity Market Prices and Incentives to Invest in Thermal Power Plants under Increasing Wind Energy Supply. In: Energy Economics (2011), 2, pp. 249–256
 mit P. T. Truong und T. Brucker: Economic Impact Assessment of Climate Change: A Multi-Gas Investigation. In: The Energy Journal, Multi-Greenhouse Gas Mitigation and Climate Policy, Special Issue 3, S. 441–460, 2006
 Induced Technological Change in a Multi-Regional, Multi-Sectoral, Integrated Assessment Model (WIAGEM): Impact Assessment of Climate Policy Strategies. In: Special Issue of Ecological Economics, Vol. 54/2-3 S. 293–305, 2005
 International Climate Coalitions and trade - Assessment of cooperation incentives by issue linkage. In: Energy Policy, Vol. 32, Iss. 4, S. 455–465, 2004
 Global Economic Implications of alternative Climate Policy Strategies. In: Environmental Science and Policy, Vol. 5, Iss. 5, S. 367–384, 2002

References

External links
 
 Claudia Kemfert homepage at the Hertie School of Governance
 Lecture to the Humboldt University Berlin, 1 December 2004 
 Homepage of the Energy, Transportation, and Environment department at German Institute for Economic Research (DIW Berlin) 
 Intergovernmental Panel on Climate Change IPCC (English)
 Stanford Energy Modelling Forums EMF (English)
 Webpage Claudia Kemfert

1968 births
Living people
People from Delmenhorst
German economists
German women economists
German women academics
Bielefeld University alumni
University of Oldenburg alumni
Academic staff of the Humboldt University of Berlin
Sustainability advocates
Academic staff of the University of Siena
Academic staff of Hertie School